Frissiras Museum is a contemporary painting museum in Plaka Athens, Greece. It was founded and endowed by Vlassis Frissiras, an art-collecting lawyer. Its permanent collection consists of 3000 paintings and sculptures by Greek and other European artists on the subject of the human form.

External links
City of Athens
www.athensinfoguide.com

Museums in Athens
Art museums and galleries in Greece